The 1978 edition of Copa Libertadores was won by Boca Juniors, of Argentina for the second straight year, after defeating Deportivo Cali of Colombia in the final.

Group stage
Boca Juniors were bye to the second round as holders.

Group 1 (Argentina, Ecuador)

Group 2 (Bolivia, Peru)

Group 3 (Brazil, Chile)

Group 4 (Colombia, Uruguay)

Group 5 (Paraguay, Venezuela)

Semi-finals

Group A

Group B

Finals

Champion

External links
 Copa Libertadores 1978 by Karel Stokkermans at RSSSF

1
Copa Libertadores seasons